Ben David Benaiah (born 6 December 1992) is a Liberian professional footballer who plays as a center-back for Liberian First Division club LPRC Oilers and the Liberia national team.

References 

1992 births
Living people
Sportspeople from Monrovia
Liberian footballers
Association football central defenders
Nimba United FC players
LPRC Oilers players
Liberian First Division players
Liberia international footballers